Jason Gilkison is an Australian professional ballroom dance champion and choreographer.

Early life 

Gilkison was born in Perth, Australia. He was raised by his single mum, Kay. At age 4, he began dancing at the Perth ballroom dance studio, founded by his grandparents Sam and Ronnie Gilkison, the first of its kind in Australia. Gilkison has lived in Sydney, London, England and Los Angeles, United States.
He realised he was gay when he was 16 or 17.

Dance career 

At the age of 7 Gilkison was first paired with Peta Roby. Gilkison formed a professional partnership with Peta Roby in 1980 and were undefeated Australian Latin champions from 1981 to 1997. At age 23, Gilkison and Roby were the ranked pair in Ten-Dance Competition.

In 1990, Gilkison and Roby received the "Young Australian of the Year" Award. In 1991, they became the residing teachers at one of London's most prestigious ballroom schools, where they remained for seven years, training many of the world's leading dancers.

Stage 

Gilkison has served as choreographer and director for the ballroom dance stage show Burn the Floor Gilkison's longtime dance partner Roby served as associate producer of the show. Burn the Floor began touring in 1999 and reached Broadway, Manhattan in 2009.

In 2012, Gilkison choreographed Dancing with the Stars: Live in Las Vegas, a live stage show at the Tropicana in Las Vegas featuring celebrities and dancers from ABC's Dancing with the Stars. The production opened in April 2012 and ran for twelve weeks.

TV and film 

In 2008, Gilkison became a contributing choreographer for Australian version of the American reality dance-off series So You Think You Can Dance. Months later he joined the US version. Superstars of Dance, which he co-choreographed with Nakul Dev Mahajan.

As of 2014, Gilkison worked as the director of choreography on BBC One's Strictly Come Dancing.

As choreographer

So You Think You Can Dance

So You Think You Can Dance Australia

As judge 
In 2014, Jason Gilkison joined the judging panel on the 4th season of So You Think You Can Dance Australia alongside Aaron Cash, Shannon Holtzapffel and Paula Abdul.

See also 
Index of dance articles
List of dances
List of ethnic, regional, and folk dances by origin
Outline of dance

References

External links 

Australian ballroom dancers
Living people
Australian choreographers
So You Think You Can Dance choreographers
Australian LGBT entertainers
Year of birth missing (living people)